Mary Earley (1900–1993) was an American painter born in St. Louis, Missouri. She is known for her New Deal era murals.

Biography
Earley moved to Chicago with her family and then located to New York City. She attended the Art Students League of New York where she studied with Kenneth Hayes Miller, Kimon Nicolaïdes, and William C. Palmer. 

In 1940 Earley's mural Down-Rent War, Around 1845 was installed in the Delhi, New York post office. It was sponsored by the Treasury Section of Fine Arts (TSFA). The mural was one of the winner of the New Deal 48-State Competition Post Office murals.  In 1941 Earley's mural Dance of the Hop Pickers was installed in the Middleburgh, New York post office. It was sponsored by the TSFA. 

Earley died in 1992.

Earley's study for the Down-Rent War, Around 1845 is in the Smithsonian American Art Museum.

References

1900 births
1992 deaths
People from St. Louis
American women painters
20th-century American painters
American muralists
20th-century American women artists
Women muralists
Section of Painting and Sculpture artists